Vendin-lès-Béthune (literally Vendin near Béthune;) is a commune in the Pas-de-Calais department in the Hauts-de-France region of France.

Geography

Population

Places of interest
 The church of St.Vaast, dating from the nineteenth century.
 The war memorial.
 The Harlem Shake place
 The Guelton memorial

See also
Communes of the Pas-de-Calais department

References

Vendinlesbethune